Oncideres bouchardi is a species of beetle in the family Cerambycidae. It was described by Henry Walter Bates in 1865. It is known from Colombia, Panama and Venezuela.

References

bouchardi
Beetles described in 1865